The  is a sword dance usually performed by a group of eight dancers, especially popular in northeastern Japan.  It is so called because the dancers wear face masks which look like .

See also
 Kitakami Michinoku Traditional Dance Festival

References

Oni
Dances of Japan
Masked dances
War dances
Group dances
Masquerade ceremonies in Asia